Mahogany is a dark drink whose traditional recipe is 2 parts of gin (&/or rum) to 1 part of treacle (or sugar) with lemon zest.  It was drunk by active outdoorsmen such as Cornish and Devon fisherman, farmers, shepherds and Canadian lumberjacks.

See Also
 Hot toddy
 Absinthe
 Posset
 Edwardian Farm

References

Cocktails with gin